Sanal George is an Indian sound designer and production sound mixer who is based in Mumbai. He is the recipient of the 65th National Film Award of India for Best Sound Design for the feature film Walking with the Wind. He was also awarded the Asian Film Academy fellowship in 2013 as part of the Busan International Film Festival, Busan, South Korea. Sanal was awarded the Kerala State Television Award 2016 for the Malayalam short film Chaver.

Early life 
Sanal George hails from Peruvannamuzhi near Calicut, Kerala. He completed his graduation before taking up his post-graduation course in Sound Recording & Design from the Film and Television Institute of India (FTII), Pune. While at FTII, he was awarded the International Indian Film Academy (IIFA) and Resul Pookutty Foundation Scholarship for academic excellence.

Career 
He started his career as an Assistant Sound Mixer in Shashant Shah's 'Chalo Dilli' in 2010. Over the years, he has worked in various projects including but not limited to feature films, short films and documentaries as Sound Designer and Production Sound Mixer.

He was associated with Aamir Khan's film Dangal as an assistant sound recordist to Subhadeep Mitra.

He was the recipient of the 65th National Film Award of India for Best Sound Design for the Ladakhi-language feature film Walking with the Wind, released in the year 2017. Resul Pookutty expressed his joy over George's win highlighting that he was the winner of the Resul Pookutty-IIFA Foundation Scholarship.

Filmography

In the media 
Sanal George was one of the 200 alumni of the Film and Television Institute of India (FTTI) in Pune who have written a letter to the Ministry of Information and Broadcasting expressing disapproval over the institution's decision to no longer allow heads of departments to be a part of the academic council.The letter, which has been signed by numerous prominent alumni including Academy Award winner Resul Pookutty, film directors Anoop Singh and several others.

References 

Living people
Indian sound designers
Film musicians from Kerala
Musicians from Kozhikode
Film and Television Institute of India alumni
21st-century Indian composers
Best Audiography National Film Award winners
Year of birth missing (living people)